Combinations and permutations in the mathematical sense are described in several articles.

Described together, in-depth:
 Twelvefold way

Explained separately in a more accessible way:
 Combination
 Permutation

For meanings outside of mathematics, please see both words’ disambiguation pages:
 Combination (disambiguation)
 Permutation (disambiguation)